Apolloniatis ("near Apollonia") may refer to several different places in the ancient world:

A large, shallow lake of ancient Bithynia, the modern Ulubat Gölü in Turkey
A region about Sittace, also called Sittacene